Euxoa auripennis is a moth of the family Noctuidae first described by J. Donald Lafontaine in 1974. It is found in western North America from eastern North Dakota and south-western Manitoba west to central British Columbia, south to southern California and Colorado.

The wingspan is 30–34 mm. Adults are on wing in August to September. There is one generation per year.

The larvae feed on various herbs at the soil surface.

External links

"Euxoa auripennis [Noctuidae]". Macromoths of Northwest Forests and Woodlands. U.S. Geological Survey. Archived June 27, 2013.

Euxoa
Moths of North America
Moths described in 1974